Keaggy is a surname. Notable people with the surname include:

 Cheri Keaggy (born 1968), American gospel singer and songwriter
 Phil Keaggy (born 1951), American guitarist and vocalist